Bergamelli is an Italian surname. Notable people with the surname include:

Dario Bergamelli (born 1987), Italian footballer
Giancarlo Bergamelli (born 1974), Italian former alpine skier 
Monica Bergamelli (born 1984), Italian artistic gymnast
Norman Bergamelli (born 1971), Italian former alpine skier
Sergio Bergamelli (born 1970), Italian former alpine skier   

Italian-language surnames